Boukary Dramé (born 22 July 1985) is a professional footballer who plays as a left-back. Born in France, he represented Senegal at international level.

Club career

Paris Saint-Germain
Born in Villepinte, Seine-Saint-Denis, Dramé began playing football at CSL Aulnay-sous-Bois before joining the centre of pre-training of Paris Saint-Germain F.C. at Verneuil. Having come through the Paris Saint-Germain F.C. youth ranks, he was promoted to the first team in 2005 and played his first game in Ligue 1 on 11 September 2005 against RC Strasbourg. He went on to spend two years in the first team, with different outcomes: four matches in 2005–06, 20 in the next, with the capital outfit barely avoiding relegation in the latter.

Sochaux
In July 2007, after refusing the extension of his contract with Paris Saint-Germain in August 2007, Dramé signed a four-year deal at fellow first divisioner FC Sochaux-Montbéliard. At Sochaux, he appeared scarcely throughout his first campaign. He picked up a serious ankle sprain on his debut against former club PSG.

On 1 September 2008, Dramé joined Spanish second division's Real Sociedad on a season-long loan. He made his debut in a 2–1 win at Gimnàstic de Tarragona, his only appearance of the season. In 2009, he joined Birmingham City on trial, and was keen on a switch to the English Premier League, but did not earn himself a contract.

During the 2010–11 season Drame played 26 games for FC Sochaux-Montbéliard and scored two goals. He was sidelined with knee surgery from January for a few weeks. With his contract due to expire at the end of the season, Sochaux offered him a new deal they failed to meet Drame's wage demands. His contract expired at the end of the 2011 season and he became a free agent. Clubs like Beşiktaş, Trabzonspor, Lecce and VfB Stuttgart showed interest in the player after his release. In June 2011 Drame was linked with a move to Newcastle United.

Chievo
In August 2011, it was reported that Drame had joined Leeds United on trial. On 23 August, he was transferred from Sochaux to ChievoVerona on a free transfer.

Paganese
After not playing in the 2018–19 season, on 3 October 2019 he signed with Serie C club Paganese.

References

External links

1985 births
Living people
People from Villepinte, Seine-Saint-Denis
Footballers from Seine-Saint-Denis
French sportspeople of Senegalese descent
Citizens of Senegal through descent
Association football defenders
French footballers
Senegalese footballers
Paris Saint-Germain F.C. players
FC Sochaux-Montbéliard players
Real Sociedad footballers
A.C. ChievoVerona players
Atalanta B.C. players
S.P.A.L. players
Paganese Calcio 1926 players
Ligue 1 players
Serie A players
Serie C players
Senegal international footballers
Senegalese expatriate footballers
Expatriate footballers in Spain
Expatriate footballers in Italy
Senegalese expatriate sportspeople in Italy
Senegalese expatriate sportspeople in Spain
French expatriate footballers
French expatriate sportspeople in Italy
French expatriate sportspeople in Spain